Thin may refer to:
 a lean body shape. (See also: emaciation, underweight)
 Thin (film), a 2006 HBO documentary about eating disorders
 Paper Thin (disambiguation), referring to multiple songs
  Thin (web server), a Ruby web-server based on Mongrel
Thin (name)

See also
 
 
 Thin client, a computer in a client-server architecture network.
 Thin film, a material layer of about 1 μm thickness.
 Thin-film deposition, any technique for depositing a thin film of material onto a substrate or onto previously deposited layers
 Thin film memory, high-speed variation of core memory developed by Sperry Rand in a government-funded research project
 Thin-film optics, the branch of optics that deals with very thin structured layers of different materials
 Thin layer chromatography (TLC), a chromatography technique used in chemistry to separate chemical compounds
 Thin layers (oceanography), congregations of phytoplankton and zooplankton in the water column
 Thin lens, lens with a thickness that is negligible compared to the focal length of the lens in optics
 Thin Lizzy, Irish rock band formed in Dublin in 1969
 Thin Man (disambiguation)
 The Thin Blue Line (disambiguation) 
 Thin capitalisation